Dossabhoy Muncherji Raja (1873–1947) was the first native Indian to be appointed 'Principal Appraiser' of precious stones for the customs office of the Bombay Presidency, which was then a province of British India.

The title of Khan Sahib was conferred upon Dossabhoy Raja on 2 January 1933 by the (then) Viceroy and Governor General of India, Lord Willingdon, in recognition of his role in the apprehension of a gang of smugglers. Raja had surreptitiously visited Jamnagar on the Gulf of Kutch in Gujarat, which was then under a Nawab's rule and outside British Imperial jurisdiction. Clad in a dhoti and posing as a Gujarati trader, Raja had then risked his life to collect information on smugglers operating on the northern borders of the Presidency. The information Raja collected led to the arrest of the gang.

Dossabhoy Muncherji Raja was a Parsi-Zoroastrian and a resident of Bombay's (today Mumbai) Dadar Parsi Colony. The Citation (Sanad) of the Khan Sahib title and the coveted Khan Sahib medal are today in the possession of Raja's descendants in Mumbai.

1873 births
1947 deaths
Parsi people
Indian civil servants
People from British India